Sydney riots may refer to:

Sydney Riot of 1879, at a cricket match between England and New South Wales
2004 Redfern riots, in an inner Sydney suburb following the death of TJ Hickey 
2005 Macquarie Fields riots, in southwestern Sydney
2005 Cronulla riots, a race riot in Sydney's southern suburbs
2012 Sydney Islamic riots, in response to the video Innocence of Muslims